The Walker Motor Car Company was active from 1905 to 1906 in Detroit, Michigan.

Advertisements

References

Motor vehicle manufacturers based in Michigan
Defunct motor vehicle manufacturers of the United States
Manufacturing companies based in Detroit
Vehicle manufacturing companies established in 1905
American companies established in 1905
Vehicle manufacturing companies disestablished in 1906
1905 establishments in Michigan
1900s disestablishments in Michigan
Defunct manufacturing companies based in Michigan